Gazeh or Gezeh or Gazzeh may refer to:
 Gezeh, Hormozgan
 Gezeh, Isfahan
 Gazeh, Lorestan
 Gazeh, Semnan